The Central Atlantic Collegiate Conference men's basketball tournament is the annual conference basketball championship tournament for the Central Atlantic Collegiate Conference. The tournament has been held annually since 2002. It is a single-elimination tournament and seeding is based on regular season records.

The winner, declared conference champion, receives the CACC's automatic bid to the NCAA Men's Division II Basketball Championship.

Results

Championship records

Chestnut Hill and Georgian Court have not yet qualified for the CACC tournament finals.
Concordia (NY) and NJIT never qualified for the CACC tournament finals as a conference member.
 Schools highlighted in pink are former members of the CACC.

See also
 CACC women's basketball tournament

References

NCAA Division II men's basketball conference tournaments
Basketball Tournament, Men's
Recurring sporting events established in 2002